PS-124 Karachi Central-II is a constituency of the Provincial Assembly of Sindh.

General elections 2018

General elections 2013

See also
 PS-123 Karachi Central-I
 PS-125 Karachi Central-III

References

External links
 Election commission Pakistan's official website
 Awazoday.com check result
 Official Website of Government of Sindh

Constituencies of Sindh